The 2021 Robert Morris Colonials football team represented the Robert Morris University during the 2021 NCAA Division I FCS football season. The Colonials played their home games at the Joe Walton Stadium in Moon Township, PA. The team was coached by fourth-year head coach Bernard Clark.

Schedule 
Robert Morris announced its 2021 football schedule on April 21, 2021. The 2021 schedule consisted of 5 home and 6 away games in the regular season.

References

Robert Morris
Robert Morris Colonials football seasons
Robert Morris Colonials football